Sabin Dam was a hydroelectric dam on the Boardman River in Grand Traverse County, Michigan. It was owned by the county as a recreational site, but it was formerly owned and used by Traverse City Light & Power.

History 

In 1906, Sabin Dam was the third dam built on the Boardman River. Sabin was enlarged and rebuilt in 1914, and again in 1930 along with Boardman Dam. These dams ran fluently, producing hydroelectricity on the Boardman for nearby towns like Traverse City and Chums Corner.
In the 1960’s, both Boardman and Sabin Dams were abandoned, and then in the late 1980’s they were revitalized and refitted with new generation equipment. Sabin had an installed capacity of 500kW with one turbine. The other wheelpit (Sabin originally had 2 turbines before being abandoned) was used only to pass excess water through the powerhouse. In 2005, all of the hydroelectric dams on the river were decommissioned. In 2013 and 2017, Brown Bridge and Boardman Dams were removed, respectively. Sabin was the last to be removed. It was proposed that in 2018, Sabin Dam would be removed, letting the Boardman River flow in its original channel. The proposal was followed through and in 2018 the Sabin Dam was removed.

Recreation and nature 
The dam pond used to have little to no recreation uses on the water, but there are a series of trails along the western side of the used to be pond. The Boardman River Nature Center is also just to the west of where the dam used to be.

References 

Dams in Michigan
Hydroelectric power plants in Michigan
Former hydroelectric power plants in the United States
Dams completed in 1902
1902 establishments in Michigan
Buildings and structures in Grand Traverse County, Michigan
Former dams